Lahr Airport (German: Flughafen Lahr, marketed as Airport Lahr, formerly as Black Forest Airport Lahr)  is a privately owned and operated commercial airport located in Lahr, Germany, situated in the Black Forest. It is used for general aviation and freight transport.

History
The airport is on the site of the former Canadian Forces Base Lahr, a Canadian military base that served as one of the headquarters of Canadian Forces Europe during the Cold War. It was operated primarily as an air force base before the Royal Canadian Air Force was unified with other branches into the Canadian Forces. The military base was closed in 1994 with the end of the Cold War, and the site converted to civilian use. Prior to occupation by the RCAF in 1967 after NATO Forces were mandated to leave France, it had been a Base of the French Air Force.

Airlines and Destinations
There are no scheduled passenger services at the Lahr Airport.

See also
 List of airports in Germany
 Transport in Germany

References

External links
 Official website
 
 

Lahr
Buildings and structures in Ortenaukreis